Stanley is a city in Buchanan and Fayette counties in the U.S. state of Iowa. The population was 81 at the time of the 2020 census.

Geography
Stanley is located at  (42.641939, -91.811877).

Demographics

2010 census
As of the census of 2010, there were 125 people, 43 households, and 34 families living in the city. The racial makeup of the city was 90.4% White, 0.8% African American, 1.6% Native American, and 7.2% from two or more races. Hispanic or Latino of any race were 1.6% of the population.

There were 43 households, of which 39.5% had children under the age of 18 living with them, 60.5% were married couples living together, 9.3% had a female householder with no husband present, 9.3% had a male householder with no wife present, and 20.9% were non-families. 16.3% of all households were made up of individuals, and 9.3% had someone living alone who was 65 years of age or older. The average household size was 2.91 and the average family size was 3.29.

The median age in the city was 34.3 years. 34.4% of residents were under the age of 18; 8% were between the ages of 18 and 24; 20.8% were from 25 to 44; 20% were from 45 to 64; and 16.8% were 65 years of age or older. The gender makeup of the city was 46.4% male and 53.6% female.

2000 census
As of the census of 2000, there were 128 people, 42 households, and 34 families living in the city. The racial makeup of the city was 96.09% White, and 3.91% from two or more races.

There were 42 households, out of which 47.6% had children under the age of 18 living with them, 73.8% were married couples living together, 4.8% had a female householder with no husband present, and 19.0% were non-families. 16.7% of all households were made up of individuals, and 11.9% had someone living alone who was 65 years of age or older. The average household size was 3.05 and the average family size was 3.41.

In the city, the population was spread out, with 38.3% under the age of 18, 2.3% from 18 to 24, 28.9% from 25 to 44, 20.3% from 45 to 64, and 10.2% who were 65 years of age or older. The median age was 34 years. For every 100 females, there were 82.9 males. For every 100 females age 18 and over, there were 97.5 males.

The median income for a household in the city was $30,313, and the median income for a family was $31,563. Males had a median income of $27,917 versus $11,375 for females. The per capita income for the city was $9,631. There were 17.1% of families and 22.4% of the population living below the poverty line, including 35.2% of under eighteens and none of those over 64.

Education
It is within the Oelwein Community School District.

References

Cities in Buchanan County, Iowa
Cities in Fayette County, Iowa
Cities in Iowa